Cotton Township may refer to the following townships in the United States:

 Cotton Township, Switzerland County, Indiana
 Cotton Township, St. Louis County, Minnesota

See also 
 Cotton Hill Township, Sangamon County, Illinois